This is a list of ice hockey players who died in wars. The team is the last team the person played for.

* : Member of the Hockey Hall of Fame

World War I

World War II
Two National Hockey League players were killed in World War II.

See also
 List of ice hockey players who died during their playing careers

References

Died in wars
Ice hockey
Ice hockey